Fudan University is a metro station of Line 18 as part of Shanghai Metro. Located west of the intersection of Handan Road and Guoquan Road in Yangpu District, Shanghai, the station is located on the western edge of the Handan campus of Fudan University, the main campus of the university. It opened with the rest of phase one of Line 18 on December 30, 2021.

References 

Railway stations in Shanghai
Shanghai Metro stations in Yangpu District
Line 18, Shanghai Metro
Railway stations in China opened in 2021